Capitol Beaver Family is a 1985 bronze sculpture depicting three beavers by artist Kenneth M. Scott, installed outside the Oregon State Capitol, in Salem, Oregon, United States. It was donated by the Willamette Christmas Association.

Description

The sculpture measures approximately 3 ft, 2 in. x 58 in. x 48 in., and rests on a concrete base that measures 23 x 70 x 58 in. An inscription on a plaque installed on the south side of the base reads:

History
The sculpture's condition was deemed "treatment needed" by Smithsonian Institution's "Save Outdoor Sculpture!" program in September 1992.

See also

 1985 in art

References

External links
 

1985 establishments in Oregon
1985 sculptures
Animal sculptures in Oregon
Bronze sculptures in Oregon
Mammals in art
Outdoor sculptures in Salem, Oregon
Statues in Oregon